The Carver Theatre is a theater located in New Orleans, Louisiana. The theatre was originally built in 1950 and was used for concerts, plays, off-broadway shows, films, conventions, graduations, Mardi Gras balls, dance recitals, corporate events and private parties.

History 
The Carver Theater, named after George Washington Carver, is on the National Register of Historic Places. It was built in 1950, as a state-of-the-art theaters for blacks in New Orleans. The Carver Theater retired as a movie theater in 1980 and became a housing office operation and medical clinic.

The theater sustained heavy damage from six feet of water during Hurricane Katrina. The building was completely renovated and opened in 2014 after a $8 million renovation. During the renovation, the building's wood frame and drywall were removed. The exterior architectural details were preserved, including the display windows which once held movie posters.

See also
List of music venues
Theatre in Louisiana
National Register of Historic Places listings in Orleans Parish, Louisiana

References

Music venues in Louisiana
Performing arts centers in Louisiana
Theatres in New Orleans
Theatres on the National Register of Historic Places in Louisiana
National Register of Historic Places in New Orleans
Historically African-American theaters and music venues